John Mais may refer to:
 John Mais (gymnast), American gymnast
 John A. Mais, German racing driver
 John Mais (planter), planter, politician and slave-owner in Jamaica